Madhavan Nair, commonly known by his stage name Madhu, is an Veteran Indian film actor, director, producer, and former film studio owner, who works in Malayalam cinema.

Madhu has so far acted in more than 400 movies including Malayalam, Hindi and Tamil languages. Madhu made his directoral debut in 1970 through the movie Priya, based on the novel ‘Thevadissi’ written by C. Radhakrishnan. Madhu directed eleven more movies including hit films like Sindooracheppu, Manyasree Viswamithran, Neela Kannukal, Akkaldaama, Kamam Krodham Moham, Theekkanal, Dheerasameere Yamuna Theere, Aaraadhana, Oru Yuga Sandhya and Udayam Padinjaru. He was the producer of most of these films. He also produced movies like Kaithappoo, Asthamayam, Shudhikalasham, Prabhatha Sandhya, Vaiki Vanna Vasantham, Archana Teacher, Grihalakshmi, Njan Ekananu, Rathilayam and Mini. He also produced and directed a movie in English ‘'Sunrise in the West'’, which was entirely shot in the United States.

As actor 

Madhu has acted in nearly 400 films in various languages in the span of 59 years.

Malayalam films

1960s

1970s

1980s

1990s

2000s

2010s

2020s

Hindi films

Tamil films

As director

As producer 
Sathi (1972)
Manyasree Vishwamithran (1974)
Akkaldaama (1975)
Kaamam Krodham Moham (1975)
Kaithappoo (1978)
Asthamayam (1978)
Prabhaathasandhya (1979)
Shudhikalasham (1979)
Vaiki Vanna Vasantham (1980)
Grihalakshmi (1981)
Archana Teacher (1981)
Njaan Ekananu(1982)
Rathilayam (1983)
Udayam Padinjaru (1986)
Mini(1995)

As playback singer 
 Sahakarikkatte Sahaja (Bit) ... Ramanan (1967)
 Ariyoo (Bit) ... Ramanan (1967)
 Ramananeeyennil (Bit) ... Ramanan (1967)

In television

References

External links

Official website

Indian filmographies
Male actor filmographies